Borelli is a surname of Italian origin. The name refers to:

Alfredo Borelli (1858–1943) French born Italian zoologist
Carla Borelli (b. 1942), American television actress
Deneen Borelli, American author and television personality
Florencia Borelli (b. 1992), Argentine middle- and long-distance runner
Giovanni Alfonso Borelli (1608–1679), Italian Renaissance physicist and mathematician
Guido Borelli (b. 1952), Italian painter
Jake Borelli (b. 1991), American actor
Joseph Borelli (b. 1982), Member of the New York City Council, representing District 51.
Juan José Borrelli (b. 1970), Argentine professional football player
Jorge Borelli (b. 1964), Argentine professional football player
Lyda Borelli (1884–1959), Italian theater and film actress
Roberto Borelli (b. 1963), Brazilian water polo player
Sergio Borelli (1923–2021), Italian journalist

See also
Borrell

Italian-language surnames